An atlas is a collection of maps.

Atlas may also refer to:

Mythology
 Atlas (mythology), an Ancient Greek Titanic deity
 Atlas, the first legendary king of Atlantis
 Atlas of Mauretania, a legendary king

Places

United States
 Atlas, California
 Atlas, Illinois
 Atlas, Texas
 Atlas, West Virginia
 Atlas, Wisconsin
 Atlas District, in Washington, D.C.
 Atlas Peak AVA, a California wine region
 Atlas Township, Michigan

Other places
 Atlas Cinema, a historic movie theatre in Istanbul, Turkey
 Atlas Mountains, a set of mountain ranges in northwestern Africa
 Atlas, Nilüfer, a village in Bursa Province, Turkey

People with the name
 Atlas (given name)
 Atlas (graffiti artist) 
 Atlas DaBone, American wrestler and football player
 Charles Atlas (1892–1972), Italian-American bodybuilder
 Charles Atlas (artist)
 David Atlas (born 1924), American meteorologist
 James Atlas (1949-2019), American writer, editor and publisher
 Meir Atlas (1848–1926), Lithuanian rabbi
 Natacha Atlas (born 1964), Belgian singer
 Nava Atlas, American book artist and author
 Omar Atlas (born 1938), former Venezuelan professional wrestler
 Scott Atlas (born 1955), American conservative health care policy advisor
 Teddy Atlas (born 1956), American boxing trainer and commentator
 Tony Atlas (born 1954), American wrestler and bodybuilder

Arts, entertainment, and media

Comics
 Atlas (comic book series), by Dylan Horrocks
 Agents of Atlas, a Marvel Comics mini-series
 Atlas Comics (1950s), a publisher
 Atlas/Seaboard Comics, a 1970s line of comics

Fictional characters
 Atlas (DC Comics), any of several fictional characters
 Atlas (Teen Titans)
 Atlas, an Astro Boy (1980) character
 Atlas (BioShock)
 Atlas, a BattleMech in the BattleTech universe
 Atlas, an antagonist in Mega Man ZX Advent
 Atlas, a Portal 2 character
 Atlas, a PS238 character
 Erik Josten, a.k.a. Atlas, a Marvel Comics supervillain
 The Atlas, a strong driving force from No Man's Sky

Literature
 Atlas, a photography book by Gerhard Richter
 ATLAS of Finite Groups, a group theory book
 Atlas Shrugged, a novel by Ayn Rand
 The Atlas (novel), by William T. Vollmann

Music

Groups
 Atlas (band), a New Zealand rock band
 Atlas Sound, the solo musical project of Deerhunter lead singer and guitarist Bradford Cox

Musicians
 Black Atlass, a Canadian musician

Albums
 Atlas (Kinky album)
 Atlas (Parkway Drive album)
 Atlas (Real Estate album)
 Atlas (RÜFÜS album)

Operas
 Atlas (opera), 1991, by Meredith Monk
Atlas: An Opera in Three Parts, a 1993 recording of Monk's opera

Songs
 "Atlas" (Battles song), 2007
 "Atlas" (Bicep song), 2020
 "Atlas" (Coldplay song), 2013
"Atlas", a song by Caligula's Horse from the album The Tide, the Thief & River's End
 "Atlas", by Parkway Drive
 "Atlas", a song by Man Overboard from Man Overboard
 "Atlas", a song by Jake Chudnow, used as the main theme in the YouTube series Mind Field

Periodicals
 Atlas (magazine)
 The Atlas (newspaper), published in England from 1826 to 1869

Other uses in arts, entertainment, and media
 Atlas (1961 film), an action-adventure film
 Atlas (upcoming film), an upcoming American science fiction thriller film
 Atlas (statue), iconic statue by Lee Lawrie in Rockefeller Center
 Atlas, a book about flora and/or fauna of a region, such as atlases of the flora and fauna of Britain and Ireland
 Atlas Entertainment, a film production company
 Atlas folio, a book size
 Atlas Media Corp., a non-fiction entertainment company
 Atlas Press, a UK publisher
 RTV Atlas, a broadcaster in Montenegro
 The Atlas (video game), a 1991 multiplatform strategy video game
 Atlas (video game), a massively-multiplayer online video game released for early access in 2018
 Atlas Corporation, a fictional arms manufacturer in the video game series Borderlands

Brands and enterprises
 Atlas (appliance company), in Belarus
 Atlas Consortium, a group of technology companies
 Atlas Copco, a Swedish company founded in 1873
 Atlas Corporation, an investment company
 Atlas Elektronik, a German naval/marine electronics and systems business
 Atlas Group, a Pakistani business group
 Atlas Mara Limited, formerly Atlas Mara Co-Nvest Limited, a financial holding company that owns banks in Africa
 Atlas Model Railroad, American maker of model trains and accessories
 Atlas Network, formerly Atlas Economic Research Foundation
 Atlas Press (tool company)
 Atlas Solutions, an online advertising subsidiary of Meta Platforms
 Atlas Van Lines, a moving company
 Atlas-Imperial, an American diesel engine manufacturer
 Dresser Atlas, a provider of oilfield and factory automation services
 Tele Atlas, a Dutch mapping company
 Western Atlas, an oilfield services company

Computing and technology
 Atlas (computer), a 1960s supercomputer
 Atlas Supervisor, its operating system
 Atlas (robot)
 ATLAS (software), a tool to scan American citizenship records for candidates for denaturalization
 Atlas, a computer used at the Lawrence Livermore National Laboratory in 2006
 Abbreviated Test Language for All Systems (ATLAS), a computer language for equipment testing
 Advanced Technology Leisure Application Simulator (ATLAS), a hydraulic motion simulator used in theme parks
 ASP.NET AJAX (formerly "Atlas"), a set of ASP.NET extensions
 ATLAS Transformation Language, a programming language for model transformation
 Atlas.ti, a qualitative analysis program
 Automatically Tuned Linear Algebra Software (ATLAS)
 Texture atlas, in computer graphics, a large image containing multiple smaller images
 UNIVAC 1101, a 1950s American computer

Science

Astronomy
 Atlas (comet) (C/2019 Y4)
 Atlas (crater), on the near side of the Moon
 Atlas (moon), a satellite of Saturn
 Atlas (star), a triple star system in the constellation of Taurus and a member of the Pleiades
 Advanced Topographic Laser Altimeter System (ATLAS), a space-based lidar instrument on ICESat-2
 Asteroid Terrestrial-impact Last Alert System (ATLAS)

Mathematics
 Atlas (topology), a set of charts
 A set of charts which covers a manifold
 A smooth structure, a maximal smooth atlas for a topological manifold

Physics
 Argonne Tandem Linear Accelerator System (ATLAS), at the Argonne National Laboratory
 ATLAS experiment, a particle detector for the Large Hadron Collider at CERN
 Atomic-terrace low-angle shadowing (ATLAS), a nanofabrication technique

Biology and healthcare
 Atlas (anatomy), part of the cervical spine
 Atlas personality, the personality of someone whose childhood was characterized by excessive responsibilities
 Brain atlas, a neuroanatomical map of the brain of a human or other animal

Animals and plants
 Atlas bear
 Atlas beetle
 Atlas cedar
 Atlas moth
 Atlas pied flycatcher, a bird
 Atlas turtle

Sport
 Atlas Delmenhorst, a German association football club
 Atlas F.C., a Mexican professional football club
 Club Atlético Atlas, an Argentine amateur football club
 KK Atlas, a former Serbian men's professional basketball club

Transport

Aerospace
 Atlas (rocket family)
 SM-65 Atlas intercontinental ballistic missile (ICBM)
 AeroVelo Atlas, a human-powered helicopter
 Airbus A400M Atlas, a military aircraft produced from 2007–present
 Armstrong Whitworth Atlas, a British military aeroplane produced 1927–1933
 Atlas Air, an American cargo airline
 Atlas Aircraft, a 1940s aircraft manufacturer
 Atlas Aircraft Corporation, a South African military aircraft manufacturer
 Atlas Aviation, an aircraft maintenance firm
 Atlas Blue, a Moroccan low-cost airline
 Atlasjet, a Turkish airline
 Birdman Atlas, an ultralight aircraft
 HMLAT-303, U.S. Marine Corps helicopter training squadron
 La Mouette Atlas, a French hang glider design

Automotive
 Atlas (1951 automobile), a French mini-car
 Atlas (light trucks), a Greek motor vehicle manufacturer
 Atlas (Pittsburgh automobile), produced 1906–1907
 Atlas (Springfield automobile), produced 1907–1913
 Atlas, a British van by the Standard Motor Company produced 1958–1962
 Atlas Drop Forge Company, a parts subsidiary of REO Motor Car Company
 Atlas Motor Buggy, an American highwheeler produced in 1909
 General Motors Atlas engine
 Honda Atlas Cars Pakistan, a car manufacturer
 Nissan Atlas, a Japanese light truck
 Volkswagen Atlas, a sport utility vehicle
Geely Atlas, a sport utility vehicle

Ships and boats
 Atlas Werke, a defunct German shipbuilding company
 Atlas (ship), any of several merchant ships
 French ship Atlas, any of several French Navy ships
 HMS Atlas, any of several Royal Navy ships
 ST Atlas, a Swedish tugboat
 USS Atlas, any of several U.S. Navy ships

Trains
 Atlas, an 1863–1885 South Devon Railway Dido class locomotive
 Atlas, a 1927–1962 LMS Royal Scot Class locomotive
 Atlas Car and Manufacturing Company, a locomotive manufacturer
 Atlas Model Railroad

Other uses
 Atlas (architecture)
 ATLAS (simulation) (Army Tactical Level Advanced Simulation), a Thai military system
 Atlas (storm), which hit the Midwestern United States in October 2013, named by The Weather Channel
 Agrupación de Trabajadores Latinoamericanos Sindicalistas (ATLAS), a 1950s Latin American trade union confederation
 Atlas languages, Berber languages spoken in the Atlas Mountains of Morocco
 ATLAS Network, a network of European special police units
 Atlas Uranium Mill

See also
 Advanced Technology Large-Aperture Space Telescope (ATLAST)
 
 Altas (disambiguation)
 Atlant (disambiguation)